Kriška Reber is a small settlement in the Municipality of Trebnje in eastern Slovenia. Traditionally the Trebnje area was part of Lower Carniola and is now included in the Southeast Slovenia Statistical Region.

References

External links
Kriška Reber at Geopedia

Populated places in the Municipality of Trebnje